Hawkman (Carter Hall) is a superhero appearing in American comic books published by DC Comics. He is the first character to use the name Hawkman. There are two separate origins of Carter Hall; the Golden Age origin and the Post-Hawkworld (or current) origin.

The character made its live-action debut in the television series Smallville, played by Michael Shanks. He also appeared in the Arrowverse crossover "Heroes Join Forces" and in Legends of Tomorrow,  played by Falk Hentschel. Hawkman appears in the DC Extended Universe film Black Adam (2022), played by Aldis Hodge.

Publication history
The character first appeared in Flash Comics #1 (January 1940), created by writer Gardner Fox and artist Dennis Neville.

Fictional character biography

Golden Age origin
In the days of ancient Egypt, Prince Khufu was engaged in a feud with his rival, the Hungarian priest Hath-Set, who captured Khufu and his consort Chay-Ara, and killed them. In 1940, Khufu reincarnates as American archaeologist Carter Hall, and Chay-Ara as Shiera Sanders. Hath-Set reincarnates as a scientist named Anton Hastor. Upon finding the ancient knife Hath-Set used to kill him, Hall regains his memories of his past life and recognizes Hastor as the reincarnated evil priest. Using the properties of "Nth metal" to craft a gravity-defying belt, Hall creates wings and a costume, and confronts Hastor as Hawkman. He also encounters and remembers Shiera. Following Hastor's defeat, the two begin a romance.

Hawkman becomes a charter member of the Justice Society of America and takes the position of permanent chairman, following the Flash and Green Lantern. Shiera adopts the identity of Hawkgirl and fights beside Hall throughout the 1940s. In 1942, Carter enlists in the U.S. Army Air Force as an Airman and serves as a pilot with the 1st Interceptor Command during World War II.

Hawkman is JSA chairman in 1951 when the team is investigated by the "Joint Congressional Un-American Activities Committee" (based on the real-life House Un-American Activities Committee) for possible communist sympathies. Congress asks members of the JSA to reveal their identities. The heroes decline, and Hawkman and most of the JSA retire for the bulk of the 1950s.

The JSA and Hawkman regroup in the early 1960s following the Flash's meeting with his counterpart from the parallel world Earth-1, the JSA being active on Earth-2. Around this time, the Halls have married and have a son named Hector. During the 1960s, Hawkman appeared at the JSA's annual meeting with Earth-1's Justice League of America.

In the early 1980s, Hawkman is instrumental in denying his son and other JSA children membership of the JSA, leading directly to the formation of Infinity, Inc.

Following Crisis on Infinite Earths, some of Hall's history was retconned by DC when the parallel worlds were combined into one but one piece of retroactive continuity was written before Crisis and fills out early Hall history. All-Star Squadron Annual #3 states during a JSA battle against Ian Karkull, the villain imbues them with energy that retards their aging, allowing Hall and many others – as well as their spouses – to remain active into the late 20th century without infirmity.

Following the Crisis, the Golden Age and the Silver Age Hawkmen live on the same Earth until Carter is cast into Limbo in the Last Days of the Justice Society of America story.

The original Hawkworld miniseries retells the origins of Katar Hol and Shayera Thal from a modern perspective but following its success, DC launched a Hawkworld regular series, which takes place after the miniseries, resulting in a complete reboot of Hawkman's continuity.

Post-Hawkworld (or current) origin
Much of Carter Hall's post-Hawkworld history is detailed in DC's Justice Society of America and Hawkman (vol. 4), which were written mostly by David S. Goyer, Geoff Johns, and James Dale Robinson, and examine Hall's previous lives.

According to the post-Hawkworld origin, Prince Khufu lives during the reign of Ramesses II in the 19th dynasty of ancient Egypt. Khufu believes his ka, or soul, will not journey on to the land of the afterlife but that his soul and that of his betrothed, Chay-Ara, are fated to remain in the mortal world.

As prophesied by the wizard Nabu, a spacecraft lands in Egypt. Prince Khufu, Nabu, and the champion Teth-Adam search the desert and find the remains of a Thanagarian ship styled with a hawk-like motif. Nabu casts a spell translating the strange language of the female space traveler. Just before dying, she whispers the words "Nth metal", the name of the substance that powered the downed ship.

Teth-Adam lifts the ship back to Khufu's palace, where it is studied inside the Temple of Horus at Erdu. The remaining Nth metal is examined; its most obvious property is its ability to negate gravity. The remaining sample from the ship is melted and used to create several remarkable devices, including a scarab that allows Khufu to fly, a deadly knife, and a battle glove referred to as the Claw of Horus. The metal also strengthens the souls of Khufu and Chay-Ara, binding them together in their love and imprinting them with the collective knowledge of Thanagar. The villainous priest Hath-Set murders the two with the knife of Nth metal but their souls remain in the mortal plane. They are reincarnated over many lifetimes, always finding true love in each other but are cursed to be repeatedly killed at the hands of a reincarnated Hath-Set.

From Khufu to Carter Hall
After his death, Khufu's soul is reincarnated countless times in different eras and locations. Some of his known reincarnated identities have been depicted in Hawkman (vol. 4) and include, but are not limited to:

 Brian Kent (also known as the Silent Knight), alive during 5th-century Britain, lover of Lady Celia Penbrook;
 Koenrad Von Grimm, the son of a blacksmith in 14th-century Germany;
 Captain John Smith of the 16th-century Colony of Virginia;
 Hannibal Hawkes, the Nighthawk, a gunfighter in the American Old West, love of Cinnamon;
 Detective James Wright, a Pinkerton detective in the early 20th century, love of Sheila Carr.

The soul of Prince Khufu is eventually reborn as Carter Hall, an archaeologist who is active during the 1940s. After regaining the memories of his first life in Egypt, Hall uses the hawk motif of the Egyptian god Horus to inspire his role as Hawkman.

His lover Chay-Ara is reborn as archaeologist Shiera Saunders. After the two meet and marry, she becomes Hawkgirl, fighting at Carter's side. They become founding members of the Justice Society of America, and Hawkman takes the role of chairman. The pair reduce their activities in the early 1950s but become fully active again in the early 1980s, when Hall briefly joins the Justice League of America as a mentor. The two have a son called Hector Hall, who later becomes an incarnation of Doctor Fate. Just after the Crisis on Infinite Earths maxiseries, Hawkman and the JSA become trapped in a battle in an ever-repeating Ragnarök.

Years after they vanish, Hawkman and the JSA return to the early 21st century when a primitive but superpowered tribe volunteer to substitute themselves in the Ragnarök cycle. Soon after, however, Carter dies once again during the events of Zero Hour. He and his wife Shiera merge with Katar Hol and a "hawk god" creature in a new version of Hawkman, attributed to them being fundamentally unstable due to their complex origins as a result of the last Crisis. This individual is active for a brief time but loses his sanity and is banished to Limbo.

Alive again
Years later, JSA member Kendra Saunders is transported to a ravaged Thanagar by the High Priests of the Downsiders. Seeking a champion to stop the evil Onimar Synn from enslaving the planet, the priests use Kendra's centuries-old connection to Carter to bring him back to the mortal plane. Following this unorthodox resurrection, Hall retains all of the memories of his past lives, as well as those of Katar Hol, the Thanagarian Hawkman. Kendra has no interest in renewing the relationship due to her lack of memories of their shared past, and the role as chairman of the JSA goes to Mister Terrific. During the "Black Reign" storyline, however, Hawkman takes over as chairman to lead the team against Black Adam's recent takeover of Khandaq, but after his actions result in two deaths, he is asked to temporarily step down from the JSA.

After defeating Onimar Synn, Hall once again becomes a member of the JSA. Operating both with the JSA and with Hawkgirl, Hall embarks on exotic adventures that take him from the streets of St. Roch to exotic dimensions and into outer space as he fights in the Rann-Thanagar War. Following this event Carter stays in space to help mediate the truce on Rann and avenge the murder of Hawkwoman.

As a result, Hawkman is absent during DC Comics' One Year Later event. Hawkman (vol. 4) becomes Hawkgirl at issue #50. During the events of the missing year, Hall serves as a member of the Thanagarian police force, attaining the rank of Commissioner.

In 2007, Hall returns to Earth in a four-part story-arc presented in Hawkgirl #59-60 and JSA Classified #21-22 and appears as an active member of the JSA in the pages of Justice Society of America. This series was canceled with Hawkgirl issue #66 in July 2007.

After that, it is stated Katar Hol's soul has passed on from the realm of limbo, as have his memories that existed in Carter's mind. Despite this, Carter still exists in a reconstructed version of Katar Hol's body. In a Hawkman Special published in August 2008, the mysterious being called Demiurge tells Carter Hall his previous existence as Prince Khufu is an illusion.  As Demiurge departs, he calls Hawkman "Katar Hol", indicating Hawkman is Katar Hol, who believed he was Carter Hall.

Hall briefly assists the Justice League during their battle with the Shadow Cabinet by knocking out Hardware as he tried to flee from the JLA Watchtower with Arthur Light's corpse. In the aftermath of the battle, Carter reunites with Kendra after her relationship with Red Arrow ends.

Final Crisis
During the Final Crisis crossover event, Hawkman and all of the other heroes fight to stop Darkseid from destroying the DC Multiverse. In an attempt to save civilians, Checkmate creates a dimensional tunnel between universes. It begins breaking down and Lord Eye tries to close it, which will kill all the people who are still in the tunnel. Hawkman and Hawkgirl destroy Lord Eye but are caught in the explosion. All of the other people are safely transported via a second Boom Tube. This fulfills the prophecy of the Demiurge. While it is implied Hawkman and Hawkgirl are dead, author Geoff Johns has stated they are alive at the beginning of the upcoming event, the Blackest Night. It is later confirmed in Justice League of America Hawkgirl is alive but is hospitalized.

Blackest Night

In Blackest Night #1, Kendra argues with Hawkman over whether to visit Jean Loring's grave with the Atom. As the two heroes quarrel, the reanimated corpses of Ralph and Sue Dibny, who are now members of the Black Lantern Corps, enter Hawkman's sanctuary. The Black Lanterns attack, Sue impaling Hawkgirl on a spear. Ralph taunts Hawkman, who is killed shortly afterwards. Both heroes are reanimated as Black Lanterns by Black Hand.

It was also revealed in Green Lantern (vol. 4) #46 Khufu's and Chay-Ara's bodies were taken from Earth by the Zamarons and placed in the violet central power battery. Their love is the source of the Star Sapphire's powers. The pair receive black rings during the battle on Zamaron. Their escape from the central power battery causes widespread destruction on the planet.

During the battle at Coast City, the Atom is chosen by the Indigo Tribe to be more effective against Nekron's forces. The Atom tells Indigo-1 to keep his involvement in the deployment of the troops a secret, and asks that she help him find a way to resurrect Hawkman and Hawkgirl. In the final battle, Hawkman and Hawkgirl are resurrected by the white light. Kendra is revealed to be Shiera Hall, who remembers her past lives; she and Carter joyfully reunite.

Brightest Day

In the Brightest Day crossover event, Carter and Shiera follow Hath-Set, who has collected the bones from all of their past bodies, and created from them a portal to Hawkworld. While there, Carter is told by the Entity to "stop the Queen Khea" from leaving. While Hawkgirl is held by Hath-Set and his Queen Khea, Hawkman and his group of the panthera attack the Manhawks homeworld. Hawkman hears Hawkgirl's cries and goes to rescue her. His arrival leads to a confrontation with Queen Khea, who is Shiera Hall's mother. During the fight, Queen Khea controls his Nth metal mace and armor, and Hawkman is tied together with Hawkgirl. Queen Khea opens a gateway and enters the portal to the Zamaron homeworld. When she arrives on the Zamaron homeworld, Star Sapphire (Carol Ferris) frees them both to stop Queen Khea's invasion. The two attack Queen Khea as Hawkgirl wants to face her, but the Predator Entity bonds with the Queen.

Shiera and Carter separate both of them by stabbing Khea at the same time with weapons made of Zamaronian crystals. The bones of the past lives of Hawkman and Hawkgirl separate from the gateway. Animated by the violet light of love, the bones grab Khea and imprison her in the Zamaronian central power battery. Shiera and Carter, with both of their missions accomplished and their lives returned, are teleported back to St. Roch by Carol. Carter and Shiera are interrupted by Deadman, whose white ring tells them that they should lead separate lives. Carter refuses and the ring responds "So be it" and unleashes a blast of white light that kills Hawkman and Hawkgirl, turning them into dust. Deadman orders the ring to resurrect Hawkman and Hawkgirl but it refuses, saying Hawkman was brought back to life to overcome what held him back in his past life because he was essential in saving Earth.

When the "Dark Avatar" makes his presence known, Hawkman and Hawkgirl are revealed to be part of the Elementals, guardians of the forest located in Star City. They were transformed by the Entity to become the element of air and protect the Star City forest from the "Dark Avatar", which appears to be the Black Lantern version of the Swamp Thing. The Elementals are then fused with Alec Holland's body so he can be transformed by the Entity into the new Swamp Thing and battle against the Dark Avatar. After the Dark Avatar is defeated, Hawkman discovers Sheira was not resurrected. Swamp Thing tells him Shiera is everywhere, revealing that she is still the elemental of air. Afterward, Hawkman returns home yelling "Shiera!"

The New 52
In September 2011, The New 52 rebooted DC's continuity. In this new timeline, Hall tries to rid himself of his Hawkman armor by burning and burying it in a forest. However, the Nth metal suit re-bonds with him, preventing Hall from escaping his life as Hawkman. It is later revealed the current Hawkman is actually Katar Hol, with "Carter Hall" being an assumed identity.

DC Rebirth

The real Carter Hall returns as Hawkman to the DC Universe in Dark Days: The Forge. His origin as a pharaoh who is constantly being reincarnated is used for the character. Carter Hall is an archaeologist who is researching the origin of Nth metal and the powers it gives him. At some point, Carter encountered Barbatos and hit him with his mace. When the aged Batman and Superman arrive at the World Forge, they are met by a gigantic, hammer-wielding, hawk-like beast that proclaims it is Carter Hall, the dragon of Barbatos and Keeper of the Dark Forge, and that only endings are at the World Forge.

A new Hawkman series was announced in March 2017; it was written by Robert Venditti and illustrated by Bryan Hitch. The book explores Carter Hall's experiences after the events of Dark Nights: Metal and his relationship to Hawkgirl.

The comic's first arc deals with Hall, who believes there are gaps in the memories of his past lives. He recovers a mystical artifact that allows him to unlock all of his memories. He becomes aware of multiple incarnations of himself, which include Katar Hol, and  has a vision of a future Earth that has destroyed by gigantic, winged creatures that are later revealed to be spaceships known as the Deathbringers. Hall deduces his first human incarnation Prince Khufu had the same vision, resulting in a winged figure becoming an important symbol throughout his lives. 

Carter Hall also discovers he has also lived multiple lives on alien worlds, and that on at least one occasion, two or more of his reincarnations have existed simultaneously. The other lives revealed are:

 Katar Hol of Thanagar
 Catar-Ol of Krypton
 Golden Hawk, a legendary hero of an unnamed planet destroyed by the returning Deathbringers
 Avion, an ancient hero of the Microverse
 The Dragon of Barabatos
 Airwing of New Genesis
 Katarthul of Rann
 Red Harrier
 Sky Tyrant of Earth-3
 Titan Hawk

His lives throughout Earth's history include:

 Prince Khufu, the Ancient Egyptian warrior prince.
 Silent Knight, a medieval hero.
 Birdman, of the Easter Islands.
 Dr. Carlo Salón, a plague doctor in 17th Century Spain.
 Nighthawk, the gunslinging western hero.
 Carter Hall, the Golden-age version from WWII who was a member of the Justice Society of America

He also spent centuries being reincarnated on the planet Nebulen, which was being fought over by two alien armies in a seemingly endless war. Hawkman was endlessly reincarnated as a common foot soldier, alternately being part of each side. He eventually ends the war by walking into the no-man's land alone and unarmed, offering his food to the opposing side. A redheaded female enemy soldier, potentially a reincarnation of Hawkgirl, leaves her trenches to meet with him and exchange food. Both sides then abandoned the conflict and made peace, deserting en masse to settle together on Nebulen, which grows into an advanced and peaceful society. A statue memorializes the anonymous soldier whose gesture of peace ended the war.

With the aid of the descendants of people he saved in previous lives, Carter begins following a trail of clues left by his past selves to uncover the mystery of his vision, while also being randomly being pulled through time and space by unknown means to encounter his past selves. This journey leads him to the Microverse and into deep space. He deduces his past selves knew the purpose of the visions of the Deathbringers and realized they were starting to forget, and therefore left the trail for their future incarnations.

Carter experiences a vision of his original incarnation, Ktar Deathbringer, who was general of the Deathbringers, a race of winged, humanoid aliens who cut a swathe through the galaxy in the distant past, slaughtering millions on Earth, Rann, Thanagar, Krypton, and many others. The Deathbringers would sacrifice the few survivors on their temple world Qgga to a being known as the "Lord Beyond the Void". At each battlefield, Ktar would be visited by an apparition of a red-haired woman, who later revealed to be the Herald Shrra, the original incarnation of Hawkwoman. With each slaughter, his guilt and self-loathing grow. On Qgga, while preparing the final sacrifice that would allow the Lord to enter the universe, Ktar is visited by the woman again and turnsw on the Deathbringers, destroying Qgga and sending the Deathbringers into the void. Upon his death, Ktar is offered a chance to atone by endlessly reincarnating, only being allowed to finally pass on when he had saved as many people as he had killed. He is also ordered to prepare for the return of the Deathbringers, who are shown to be active in the galaxy under the leadership of Idamm, Ktar's long-term second in command.

Carter's search ends at the former site of Krypton. He is transported through time to Krypton's last day and encounters his past self Catar-Ol, a historian and tutor to Kara Zor-El, the future Supergirl. Unlike other reincarnations, Catar also possesses past life memories and is aware of the Deathbringers. He is working to build a weapon to defeat the Deathbringers, to which the trail of clues lead, but he is unable to complete it before Krypton's destruction. Carter is disheartened but Catar encourages him to find another way to save Earth, telling him he must "be the weapon". Carter returns to Earth and seeks help from Madame Xanadu. The Deathbringers attack London and Idamm personally engages Carter. Carter beats Idamm in single combat but is overwhelmed by the numbers of the Deathbringers. Taking control of the timeshifts, Carter summons all of his past selves to the present to aid him in the battle.  The Hawkmen put up a valiant fight but the Deathbringers are revealed to be immortal and seemingly unbeatable.

Idamm orders the planet destroyed but Carter rallies the Hawkmen to attack the Deathbringer's ships, disabling their weapons. Meanwhile, Carter duels with Idamm again. Carter beats Idamm down. Idamm eventually yields and surrenders the role of general to Carter, who orders the Deathbringers to stand down. Before returning to their proper places in the timestream, the other Hawkmen transfer their memories to Hall, allowing him to remember his full history for the first time.

Carter discovered another of his past lives in the form of Sky Tyrant, who was Carter Hall's reincarnation on Earth-3 and learned about his origins as Ktar Deathbringer and the debt he must pay. Sky Tyrant is afraid of dying and decides to prolong his 'immortality' and add to the debt by killing people on his Earth. After dying, Sky Tyrant is locked away in Carter's subconscious until the latter is infected by the Batman Who Laughs and a recent encounter with Shadow Thief caused Sky Tyrant to reemerge and trap Carter in his own consciousness. Sky Tyrant is confronted by Shayera Hol/Hawkwoman but soon escapes before she can defeat him. Using their shared consciousness, Sky Tyrant wishes to learn more about their history through the secret Black Journal.

Hawkwoman teams up with Carter's old friends the Atom and Adam Strange to capture and cure Carter of his infection. They catch up to Sky Tyrant on an alien world where one of his previous incarnations named Titan Hawk has hidden an artifact known as "The Key", which would have released the Lord Beyond the Void. They recover the Key and imprison Sky Tyrant on Carter's starship. When she touches the Key, her memories of all her past lives are unlocked. Sky Tyrant escapes from his cell and brawls with the three heroes; he and Shayera touch the Key together and are transported to the realm of the Lord Beyond the Void. Carter is cured of his infection. The pair are attacked by Deathbringers who recognize Carter as Ktar. Although the Deathbringers are defeated, they draw the attention of the Lord Beyond the Void.

The Lord easily overpowers them and binds them to a stone monolith, planning to absorb the energy from all of their lives, which will give him sufficient power to cross over into the universe. Carter and Shayera release the power of their thousands of lives, overloading and destroying the Lord while killing themselves. They awake in the afterlife, reverted to Ktar and Shrra. The deity explains Ktar's debt is repaid and offers to allow them to be reincarnated a final time in their favourite lives, where they will be extremely long-lived but mortal. The two agree and are restored to life in the 1940s as the Golden Age Hawkman and Hawkgirl, and reunite with their old friends in the Justice Society of America.

During a fight with the Injustice Society, Carter freezes with fear at a moment when the villains have the upper hand. Shayera throws her mace into Carter's, creating an explosion that incapacitates the Injustice Society. The JSA assumes Carter is providing a distraction for Shayera but he admits to her now he is mortal, he fears dying. Anton Hastor, an incarnation of the Hawks' ancient enemy Hath-Set, learns Prince Khufu and Chay-Ara have been reincarnated, and that they can be killed permanently. Hastor steals his Nth Metal dagger from JSA headquarters and draws the Hawks out to a train, where he has killed the passengers and resurrected them as zombies. Shayera is tackled off the train by zombies while Hastor attacks Carter, who is too fearful to fight back until Hastor threatens Shayera. Carter disarms Hastor by stabbing himself with the dagger as Shayera catches up to the train and destroys the dagger while Hastor falls to his death. In the 40th century, Hawkman and Hawkwoman are greatly aged and scarred but still alive as Hawkman finishes writing his story.

In the "Watchmen" sequel "Doomsday Clock," Lois Lane finds a flash drive while at the Daily Planet. It shows her footage of Hawkman and the rest of the Justice Society.

In the pages of "The New Golden Age", Hawkman was among the Justice Society members partaking in a group photo. When the Helmet of Fate starts heating up after Doctor Fate has a vision of "lost children", Hawkman and Atom had to get the Helmet of Fate off him. When a Huntress from a possible future ends up in 1940, Hawkman is among the Justice Society members that meet him. As Doctor Fate tries to read Huntress' mind to learn about the threat in her future, Hawkman is among those that are knocked down by the magical feedback.

Skills, abilities and equipment
The Nth metal in Hawkman's wings, belt, harness, and boots is controlled mentally and allows him to defy gravity. His wings allow him to control flight though they can be flapped through use of shoulder motions.

Hall's Nth metal also enhances his strength and eyesight, speeds healing, and regulates body temperature, preventing the need for heavy protective clothing while flying at high altitudes. Nth metal is known to affect electromagnetism as well as the strong and weak nuclear forces. It is also mentioned in Hawkman: Secret Files and Origins #1 (2002) that Nth metal has other unknown  powers.

Due to his multiple incarnations and having the memories of all of them, Khufu/Hall is an expert with a wide array of archaic weapons from his past lives, including battle axes, maces, swords, spears, and shields. As Nighthawk, he was a marksman with a pistol. Carter Hall is sometimes depicted handling futuristic technology. He has used a Thanagarian ship called "The Brontadon" and during the Rann-Thanagar War used Rannian hard-light armor. Hawkman is depicted using technologically advanced laser weaponry in a possible future (Hawkman (vol. 4) #9). Reincarnation has also given Hawkman knowledge of hundreds of languages.

As a result of his many lives and vast amount of experience, Hall is a brilliant tactician, fierce warrior, and strong leader. During the Public Enemies story arc in the Superman/Batman series, he was selected as the perfect hero to confront Batman with the advantage of his flight and strength but otherwise being Batman's equal. He is extremely intelligent and expresses a deeply romantic side towards his beloved soulmate.

For a brief time during "DC Rebirth" through a combination of the Nth Metals properties and his own cycle of reincarnation. Carter was able to summon an army of alt. selves whose lives he'd lived via reincarnation across Time & space.

Characterization

Hawkman has been characterized in comics as having a quick, fierce temper with adamant views and opinions. Even in the Golden Age, he has no problem blowing up a villain's lair with the villain inside.

Another prominent aspect of his personality is his staunch conservative views; this has brought him into conflict with Green Arrow (a liberal) several times. During the miniseries Identity Crisis, it is revealed the main reason for this animosity is the opposing views he and Green Arrow take on the mindwipe of Doctor Light.

Since his rebirth, that Carter Hall has integrated a lot of Katar Hol into his core being. He looks like a merger of Katar and himself while using the more rugged superhero attire that is a trademark of Katar Hol. Although he has Katar's dark hair, his voice and face appear to be his own as he is easily recognized by Jay Garrick upon return.

Post-Metal, Carter has become a more reserved character, in stark contrast of his personality Pre-Flashpoint. He now shows a deeper understanding of history and spirituality, and more reservation to entering battle, but is still willing to fight.

Other versions
 In Mark Waid's Kingdom Come, Carter Hall is portrayed as an anthropomorphized, literal Hawkman, who has become an eco-terrorist in the absence of Superman, wielding a large mace. He dies in a nuclear explosion that kills nearly all the metahumans.
 In Tangent Comics (now part of the DC Multiverse as Earth-9) Carter Hall is an architect who attempts to commit suicide, dragging police officer Harvey Dent with him and ultimately triggering Dent's evolution into Superman.

In other media

Television

Live-action
 Carter Hall / Hawkman appears in Smallville, portrayed by Michael Shanks. This version is a member of the Justice Society of America (JSA). Introduced in the two-part episode "Absolute Justice", Hall lost his lover Hawkgirl to Icicle several years ago. While seeking revenge, Hall put him in a vegetative state. In the present, Hall joins forces with JSA members Stargirl and Doctor Fate as well as Clark Kent, the Green Arrow, and the Martian Manhunter to fight Icicle's son, Icicle II. In the episode "Icarus", Hall sacrifices himself to defeat Slade Wilson and is buried next to his wife in Egypt.
 Carter Hall / Hawkman appears in media set in the Arrowverse, portrayed by Falk Hentschel.
 Hall first appears in the crossover event "Heroes Join Forces", in which he and Kendra Saunders meet and join forces with the Green Arrow, the Flash, and their allies to combat Vandal Savage.
 Hall appears as a series regular in the first season of Legends of Tomorrow. He and Saunders join the Legends to stop Savage, but the former is killed by the immortal, who uses Hall's body to extend his henchmen's lives before the Legends stop him. After Saunders has visions of Hall being reincarnated as one of Savage's soldiers, she eventually succeeds in restoring his memories before they overpower and kill Savage. Following this, the pair leave the Legends in 2016. In the series' 100th episode "wvrdr error 100 oest-of-th3-gs.gid30n not found", the artificial intelligence of the Legends' timeship, Gideon, starts losing her memories. To stop this, Astra Logue and Spooner Cruz use their powers to enter Gideon's mind and help her re-experience memories of past and current Legends members, such as Hall.
 Carter Hall / Hawkman appears in Stargirl, portrayed by an uncredited actor. This version is a member of the Justice Society of America. In the pilot, 10 years prior to the series, Hall was with the Justice Society when the Injustice Society attacks their headquarters and killed most of their members, during which he is killed by Brainwave.

Animation
 Carter Hall / Hawkman, with elements of Katar Hol, appears in Justice League Unlimited, voiced by James Remar. Introduced in the episode "Shadow of the Hawk", this version was born under the name Joseph Gardner before changing his name to Carter Hall and became an archeologist. While on an expedition, he found Thanagarian technology left over from two Thanagarian warriors and lovers who arrived in ancient Egypt 8,000 years earlier, came to believe he and Hawkgirl are reincarnations of the two lovers, and uses Nth metal to become Hawkman in an attempt to make her love him. Following an encounter with her, Green Lantern, and the Shadow Thief, Hall realizes he cannot force Hawkgirl to love him and leaves. Hall later makes a non-speaking cameo appearance in the series finale "Destroyer", joining Earth's heroes in repelling Darkseid's invasion.
 Carter Hall / Hawkman appears in the Batman: The Brave and the Bold episode "The Golden Age of Justice!", voiced by William Katt. This version is a member of an aged Justice Society of America.
 Carter Hall / Hawkman appears in DC Super Hero Girls, voiced by Phil LaMarr. This version speaks in a low, growling register and is easily agitated.

Film
 Carter Hall / Hawkman appears in the opening credits of Justice League: The New Frontier. This version is a member of the Justice Society of America.
 Carter Hall / Hawkman appears in Superman/Batman: Public Enemies, voiced by an uncredited Michael Gough.
 Carter Hall appears in the fan film Cooped Up, portrayed again by Falk Hentschel.
 A variation of Carter Hall / Hawkman appears in Justice Society: World War II, voiced by Omid Abtahi. This version hails from Earth-2 and is a founding member of the Justice Society of America, which was active during their Earth's version of the titular war. While assisting the JSA in stopping the Advisor, Hall is killed by the Trench.
 Carter Hall / Hawkman appears in Teen Titans Go! & DC Super Hero Girls: Mayhem in the Multiverse, voiced again by Phil LaMarr.
 Carter Hall / Hawkman appears in Black Adam, portrayed by Aldis Hodge. This version is the leader of the Justice Society.

Video games
 Carter Hall / Hawkman appears as a playable character in Batman: The Brave and the Bold – The Videogame, voiced again by William Katt.
 Carter Hall / Hawkman appears as an assist character in Scribblenauts Unmasked: A DC Comics Adventure.
 Carter Hall / Hawkman appears as a non-playable character in DC Universe Online, voiced by Jason Liebrecht.
 Carter Hall / Hawkman appears in Lego Batman 2: DC Super Heroes, voiced by Troy Baker.
 Carter Hall / Hawkman appears as a support card in the mobile version of Injustice: Gods Among Us.
 Carter Hall / Hawkman appears in Lego Batman 3: Beyond Gotham, voiced by Travis Willingham.

Miscellaneous
Carter Hall appears in issue #20 of Justice League Adventures as a member of the Justice Society.

See also
 Khufu

References

External links
A Comprehensive index of Carter Hall's (Hawkman of Earth-2) appearance through the mid-1980s
Hawkman and Hawkgirl's secret origin on dccomics.com
JSA Fact File: Hawkman

All-American Publications characters
Characters created by Gardner Fox
Characters created by Dennis Neville
Comics characters introduced in 1940
DC Comics American superheroes
DC Comics characters with accelerated healing
DC Comics characters with superhuman senses
DC Comics characters with superhuman strength
DC Comics fantasy characters
DC Comics male superheroes
Earth-Two
Egyptian mythology in comics
Egyptian superheroes
Fictional anthropologists
Fictional archaeologists
Fictional characters with death or rebirth abilities
Fictional characters with immortality
Fictional princes
Fictional ancient Egyptians
Golden Age superheroes
Fiction about reincarnation
Wingmen of Thanagar
Hawkman
Fictional clubfighters